Richard Fitch Cleveland (September 21, 1929 – July 27, 2002) was an American competition swimmer, three-time Pan American Games champion, and former world record-holder in the 100 meters and 100 yard events.

Cleveland enrolled at Ohio State University, where he swam for the Ohio State Buckeyes swimming and diving team in National Collegiate Athletic Association (NCAA) competition.

At the 1951 Pan American Games in Buenos Aires, Argentina, he won gold medals in the men's 3×100-meter medley relay, 4×200-meter freestyle relay, and 100-meter freestyle.  At the 1952 Summer Olympics in Helsinki, Finland, he competed in the 100-meter freestyle but failed to reach the final. He retired from competitions in 1955.

See also
 List of members of the International Swimming Hall of Fame
 List of Ohio State University people
 World record progression 100 metres freestyle

References

1929 births
2002 deaths
American male freestyle swimmers
World record setters in swimming
Ohio State Buckeyes men's swimmers
Olympic swimmers of the United States
Pan American Games gold medalists for the United States
Swimmers from Honolulu
Swimmers at the 1951 Pan American Games
Swimmers at the 1952 Summer Olympics
Pan American Games medalists in swimming
Medalists at the 1951 Pan American Games